Harry Kay CBE, DSc (1919–2005) was a psychologist and academic administrator.

Career
Kay attended Rotherham Grammar School and then in 1938 went to the University of Cambridge to read for a degree English. However, World War II intervened and he enlisted in the Royal Artillery, rising to the rank of lieutenant colonel. In 1946 he returned to Cambridge to complete a degree in Moral Sciences. He remained at Cambridge in the Nuffield Unit for Research into Problems of Ageing.

He moved to the University of Oxford in 1951 as a lecturer in experimental psychology. He continued his research and was awarded a PhD. In 1960, he was appointed Chair of Psychology at the University of Sheffield. It was here that he established the Social and Applied Psychology Research Unit.

In 1973, he was appointed Vice-Chancellor of the University of Exeter. He remained there until his retirement in 1984.

He was active in the British Psychological Society becoming its president in 1971. In his presidential address, he promoted 'giving psychology away'.

Research
His early research interest was experimental work on motor skills and then moved into the more general area of occupational psychology.

Honours
 1971 - 1972 - President, British Psychological Society
 President, Experimental Psychology Society
 President, Psychology Section, British Association for the Advancement of Science
 Hon DSc – University of Sheffield
 Hon DSc – University of Exeter
 1981 – CBE

References 

1919 births
2005 deaths
British psychologists
Presidents of the British Psychological Society
People educated at Rotherham Grammar School
20th-century psychologists
Vice-Chancellors of the University of Exeter
British Army personnel of World War II
Royal Artillery officers